Chris Rashley is a British sailor who finished second at the 2014 International Moth World Championships.

References

External links
Rashley Racing

British male sailors (sport)
Living people
Year of birth missing (living people)